Play-Boy is a pinball machine released by Gottlieb in 1932. The game features a card gambling theme. It should not be confused with several other pinball machines with the name Playboy as from Rally Play Company, Bally, Data East and Stern.

Description
After the success of Baffle Ball, Gottlieb used the existing production line to produce a new game. The new playfield has card graphics and was cheaper to produce because the cast metal pieces were not required. Player can play for accumulated points or play card games such as blackjack or poker with the glass ball. Play-Boy was a success and was the beginning of Gottlieb's long tradition of playing card-themed games.

Play-Boy was advertised as 24 inches long by 16 inches wide and an optional wood or metal stand was available at extra cost. 10 balls cost 1 cent, with 5 cards each, if two players were playing.

Digital versions
Play-Boy is available in the Pinball Hall of Fame: The Gottlieb Collection.

References

External links
 

1932 pinball machines
Gottlieb pinball machines